İstanbul Büyükşehir Belediyespor, also known simply as İstanbul BŞB or Istanbul BB, is a professional basketball club based in Istanbul, that plays in the Turkish Basketball Second League, the third tier of Turkey's basketball pyramid. Their home arena is Cebeci Sport Hall. The club is a part of İstanbul Büyükşehir Belediyesi Spor Kulübü.

History
İstanbul BŞB basketball was founded in 2000, as a branch of İstanbul Büyükşehir Belediyesi Spor Kulübü. The team began playing in the lower divisions of Turkish basketball league systems for 2000 season with amateur players. The team became professional in 2006 and the team played in EBBL for 2006 to 2009. In 2009, the team promoted to TB2L from EBBL. The team played TB2L till 2013–14 season. In 2013–14 season, the team finished to seven of Regular Season. In Playoffs, the team faced to Ankara DSİ S.K. in quarter-finals and beat them 2-1. Then, the team beat Aydem Pamukkale Üniversitesi in semi-finals and promoted to TBL (now called BSL). 2014–15 season was first season of İstanbul BŞB in TBL and finished to twelve.

Season by season

Players

Current roster

Depth chart

Notable players

References

External links
İstanbul BB Official Web Site
Eurobasket.com Page
TBLStat.net Profile

Basketball teams in Turkey
Turkish Basketball Super League teams
Sport in Istanbul
2000 establishments in Turkey
Basketball teams established in 2000